Sistaneh (also Romanized as Sīstāneh) is a village in Khorram Rud Rural District, in the Central District of Tuyserkan County, Hamadan Province, Iran. At the 2006 census, its population was 161, in 56 families.

References 

Populated places in Tuyserkan County